Onalaska  may refer to:
Onalaska, Texas
Onalaska, Washington
Onalaska, Wisconsin
Onalaska (town), Wisconsin
Lake Onalaska, a lake in Wisconsin

See also
Unalaska, Alaska
Alaska